Statistics of the Scottish Football League in season 1953–54.

Scottish League Division A

Scottish League Division B

See also
1953–54 in Scottish football

References

 
Scottish Football League seasons